The 1929 NC State Wolfpack football team was an American football team that represented North Carolina State University as a member of the Southern Conference (SoCon) during the 1929 college football season. In its fifth and final season under head coach Gus Tebell, the team compiled a 2–8 record (1–5 against SoCon opponents), finished in 22nd place in the conference, and was outscored by a total of 207 to 44.

Schedule

References

NC State
NC State Wolfpack football seasons
NC State Wolfpack football